Alan Stuart Gross (born April 13, 1962) is an American politician, orthopedic surgeon and a commercial fisherman who, running as an independent candidate, was the Democratic nominee for the 2020 United States Senate election in Alaska. He lost the race to incumbent Republican Dan Sullivan.

Early life and education
Gross was born in Juneau in 1962. He is the son of former Alaska Attorney General Avrum and Shari Gross, the first Executive Director of the United Fishermen of Alaska, who also founded the League of Women Voters-Alaska. As a child, he was part of the small Jewish community in Alaska, and had the first bar mitzvah in Southeast Alaska. While attending Douglas High School in Juneau, Gross developed an interest in fishing, both sport and commercial. When he was 14, he bought his first commercial fishing boat with a bank loan. He commercially gillnet fished for salmon in the summer to pay his way through college and medical school.

Gross attended Douglas High School in Juneau before enrolling at Amherst College, where he graduated in 1985 with a degree in neuroscience. He studied medicine at the University of Washington’s WWAMI Regional Medical Education Program, graduating in 1989.

Medical career
After graduating from medical school, Gross served as the president of the Bartlett Regional Hospital medical staff. In 2006, he founded and served as the president of the Juneau Bone and Joint Center. Gross retired from full-time orthopedic surgery in 2013, but continues to work part time for the Petersburg Medical Center, and volunteers at a training hospital in Cambodia every year.

Gross practiced as an orthopedic surgeon in Juneau, beginning in 1994. In 2013, Gross left his practice, along with his wife Monica Gross, to study health care economics, earning a master's of public health at University of California, Los Angeles. He has said that he grew uncomfortable with the high costs of healthcare, and pursued his MPH degree to study solutions.

Political career
After earning his MPH, Gross returned to Alaska and began his advocacy for healthcare reform. In 2017, he co-sponsored two ballot initiatives in Alaska. The Quality Health Insurance for Alaskans Act sought to add certain provisions from the Affordable Care Act into state law, including protection against discrimination based on preexisting conditions, mandatory coverage for prenatal and maternal care, and provisions that children could remain covered by their parents' insurance until age 26. The Healthcare for Alaskans Act would codify the Medicaid expansion, already in effect due to an executive order by Governor Bill Walker. Both initiatives were withdrawn from the ballot in December 2017. Supporters cited uncertainty in healthcare policy at the federal level as the reason for the withdrawal.

2020 U.S. Senate campaign

On July 2, 2019, Gross announced he would run as an independent in the 2020 U.S. Senate election in Alaska. He won the August Democratic primary against Democrat Edgar Blatchford and Independent Chris Cumings, gaining the nomination of the Alaska Democratic Party, which had endorsed him before the filing deadline.

Gross ran as an independent against Republican incumbent Senator Dan Sullivan. He had the support of the Democratic Senatorial Campaign Committee and The Lincoln Project.

Gross said, "I stepped up to do this because the Alaska economy has been failing, we’ve been losing Alaskans to the Lower 48 for the past few years, and despite that labor loss, we had the highest unemployment in the country."

The Daily Beast argued that Alaska "flirts with purple-state status" in part due to Gross's candidacy. There was speculation that the political fallout of the death of Ruth Bader Ginsburg and the Amy Coney Barrett Supreme Court nomination could dampen support for incumbent Sullivan and benefit Gross's campaign.

More than a week after the election, Sullivan's reelection in what was expected to be a close race was affirmed.

In October 2021, Gross ran for Hospital Board in Petersburg, Alaska and finished fourth.

2022 U.S. House campaign

On March 28, 2022, Gross announced he would run as an independent candidate for Alaska's at-large congressional seat that was vacated upon the death of Congressman Don Young. Although he won third place and the opportunity to compete in the general election, he withdrew on June 20, 2022.

Political positions
Despite receiving the Alaska Democratic Party's endorsement, Gross is an independent politician and says he is closer to Republicans on "issues like guns and immigration".

Gross supports an overhaul of Medicare, including the addition of a public option. He also supports raising the minimum wage, defending collective bargaining rights for workers and unions, efforts to make college more affordable and accessible, and earlier tracking into trade schools. Citing his background in science, Gross supports policies that address climate change, including the growth of renewable energy and opposition to the Pebble Mine project. He also supports ending Citizens United and fixing political corruption.

Gross fully supports instant-runoff voting. He is neutral on Universal Basic Income (UBI), which resembles the Alaska Permanent Fund (APF), saying, "The UBI check here in Alaska has been a great program, but any program like that, you have to be careful you don't disincentivize going back to the workforce."

Environmental and energy policy
Gross opposes the proposed Pebble Mine, which threatens to harm the ecosystem of Bristol Bay. His campaign could have benefited from reports of Sullivan's inconsistency on this issue, and secretly recorded tapes in which corporate executives indicate that Sullivan could switch his position on the mine after the election.

Gross accepts the scientific consensus on climate change and its impacts on Alaska. He supports diversification of Alaska's economy and its energy supply, including renewable energy. Like Sullivan, he supports oil drilling in the Arctic National Wildlife Refuge.

Gross opposes the Green New Deal.

Foreign policy
Gross has said that Russian and Chinese interest in the Arctic must be counterbalanced by a strong U.S. military. He has said that he would be a "staunch defender" of Israel.

Gun policy
Gross has said that he is a "strong proponent of the Second Amendment" and "will vote against banning any guns." He has stated support for background checks on military assault weapons.

Health care
As a physician, Gross has supported initiatives to lower health care costs. His campaign endorsed a public health care option for individuals and small businesses.

In 2017, he wrote in support of single-payer, but he did not include single-payer as part of his senatorial campaign and his radio, social media and television ads initially opposed the idea. In 2020, he said he supports federal legalization of cannabis to help small businesses and others.

Social policy
Gross was endorsed by Planned Parenthood and the Human Rights Campaign.

Electoral history

2020

References

External links 
 Campaign website

 

1962 births
20th-century American physicians
21st-century American Jews
21st-century American physicians
21st-century American politicians
Alaska Independents
Amherst College alumni
Candidates in the 2020 United States Senate elections
Jewish American people in Alaska politics
Jewish physicians
Living people
Politicians from Juneau, Alaska
University of California, Los Angeles alumni
University of Washington alumni
Candidates in the 2022 United States House of Representatives elections